Margaret Greenwood (born 14 March 1959) is a British politician who has served as the Member of Parliament (MP) for Wirral West since 2015. She is a member of the Labour Party.

Biography
A former teacher and community activist, Greenwood later worked as a web consultant. She is a founder member of Defend our NHS.

In 2013, she was selected to contest the constituency of Wirral West in the 2015 general election. In a high-profile campaign, Greenwood narrowly unseated the Conservative cabinet minister Esther McVey.

In March 2018, Greenwood began acting as Shadow Secretary of State for Work and Pensions after Debbie Abrahams temporarily stepped aside. She was appointed as a permanent replacement for the Shadow DWP Secretary in May 2018. Until November 2018, Greenwood was shadowing Esther McVey, who had returned to Parliament at the 2017 general election.

In November 2018, Greenwood expressed concern over the effects of poverty and austerity, saying: "The government should listen to the people being pushed into poverty by its policies. Universal credit is failing miserably, leaving families in debt, [in] rent arrears and at risk of becoming homeless. Three million children are growing up in poverty despite living in a working household." Greenwood also said in 2018: "There is something seriously wrong when the number of people in work in poverty is increasing faster than employment."

On 6 April 2020, upon the election of Keir Starmer as Leader of the Labour Party, Greenwood was replaced as Shadow Secretary of State for Work and Pensions by Jonathan Reynolds, becoming Shadow Minister for Schools. She resigned as Shadow Minister for Schools on 15 October 2020 to vote against the Covert Human Intelligence Sources (Criminal Conduct) Bill, which would authorise some undercover police officers and government officials to commit criminal offences, as Labour had whipped MPs to abstain.

References

External links 

|-

1959 births
Living people
Female members of the Parliament of the United Kingdom for English constituencies
Labour Party (UK) MPs for English constituencies
Politics of the Metropolitan Borough of Wirral
UK MPs 2015–2017
21st-century British women politicians
UK MPs 2017–2019
UK MPs 2019–present
21st-century English women
21st-century English people